Mirasol may refer to:

Plants
 Mirasol, common sunflower in Spanish (also girasol)

People
 Mirasol, a common female name popular in Philippines

Places

Buildings
 El Mirasol (mansion), a demolished mansion in Palm Beach, Florida, US
 Mira-sol (Barcelona–Vallès Line), a railway station in Barcelona, Spain
 Villa Mirasol (Les Sables d'Olonne), historic building in France

Inhabited places
 El Mirasol, a village and municipality in Argentina
 Villa Mirasol, a village and municipality, La Pampa Province, Argentina
 Mirasol, Lares, Puerto Rico, a barrio

Other uses
 Interferometric modulator display (IMOD, trademarked mirasol), a reflective display technology used in electronic visual displays
 Mirasol chili, a Capsicum cultivar
 Mirasol, a fictional character in the fantasy novel Chalice by Robin McKinley